Allium polyrhizum is a species of wild onion widespread across Zabaykalsky Krai, Kazakhstan, Mongolia, and China (Gansu, Hebei, Heilongjiang, Jilin, Liaoning, Inner Mongolia, Ningxia, Qinghai, Shaanxi, Shanxi and Xinjiang) at elevations 1000–3700 m.

Allium polyrhizum produces clumps of many narrowly cylindrical bulbs, each generally less than 10 cm in diameter. Scape is up to 30 cm long, round in cross-section. Leaves are tubular, less than 1 cm across, shorter than the scape. Umbel is hemispheric with many densely packed flowers. Tepals are usually pink or purple but occasionally white, either way with a green midvein.

References

polyrhizum
Onions
Flora of Kazakhstan
Flora of Mongolia
Flora of Chita Oblast
Flora of Xinjiang
Flora of Qinghai
Flora of North-Central China
Flora of Manchuria
Plants described in 1875